Sardinata is a Colombian municipality and town located in the department of Norte de Santander.

References
  Government of Norte de Santander - Sardinata
  Sardinata official website
  Sardinata portal

Municipalities of the Norte de Santander Department